The roads that join the towns of ,  and  form a triangle that encloses some of the most fertile land on the Darling Downs in Queensland, Australia. These roads are the Warrego Highway, New England Highway and Dalby–Cooyar Road. Pechey–Maclagan Road forms a large part of a group of roads that bisect the triangle from east to west, and is also part of one of the groups of roads that bisect from south to north.

Pechey–Maclagan Road is a continuous  road route in the Toowoomba region of Queensland. It is a state-controlled district road (number 418), rated as a local road of regional significance (LRRS).

Route description
It runs north-west and then south-west, leaving Pechey and running through  from east to south. It crosses  from north-east to north-west, passing the exit to Groomsville Road. It then passes through  from east to west and enters . It enters the town from the east as Lilly Street, turns north on Mocatta Street, and exits to the west as Cooke Street, which soon again becomes Pechey–Maclagan Road. Exits to Kingsthorpe–Haden Road run north and south from the town.

The road enters Highland Plains and meets the Oakey–Cooyar Road (State Route 68). It then runs north-west through  concurrent with Oakey–Cooyar Road and enters . Here it turns west and Oakey–Cooyar Road continues north. It enters  and turns north at an intersection with Jondaryan–Nungil Road and Brymaroo–Irvingdale Road. The Brymaroo military aerodrome is near this intersection. Further north it turns west and then north again, entering  from the south.

Land use along this road is mixed farming to the east and mainly crop farming to the centre and west.

Significant connecting roads

Kingsthorpe–Haden Road

Oakey–Cooyar Road

Jondaryan–Nungil Road

Brymaroo–Irvingdale Road
This road, in conjunction with Pechey–Maclagan Road and Dalby–Nungil Road, forms an east-west corridor from Pechey to Dalby.

History

The first industry in the Crows Nest district was timber cutting. The site where the town is located became a rest stop for bullock teams carrying logs to sawmills in or near  The  track they followed along the top of the Great Dividing Range eventually became the New England Highway. Settlement occurred along this road and to the west as land became available. Pechey, a small village on the road to Toowoomba, was named for Edward Wilmot Pechey, who owned sawmills in Crows Nest and Toowoomba.

Goombungee pastoral run was established in 1854. The main homestead area soon became a small town, and roads were cut from there to provide access to sources of supply, markets for products, and outstations of the property. One such road linked the town to the then Toowoomba–Crows Nest Road at Pechey.

Rosalie Plains pastoral run was established in the 1840s. As at Goombungee, roads were cut to access suppliers, markets, and outstations. In 1877  was resumed from Rosalie Plains and made available for selection to enable the establishment of many small farms. This in turn increased the need for reliable roads.

In 1889 the town that is now Maclagan was surveyed, and a butter and cheese factory was established in Quinalow. Reliable road connections from these towns were needed to provide access to markets and suppliers.

The former Shire of Rosalie, which existed from 1879 to 2008, was based in Goombungee. It was responsible for turning the original bush tracks of the area into gazetted roads, and for developing and maintaining them.

Major intersections
All distances are from Google Maps. This road is entirely within the Toowoomba local government area.

See also

 List of road routes in Queensland
 List of numbered roads in Queensland

References

Roads in Queensland